Majanji is a town in the Eastern Region of Uganda.

Location
The coordinates of the town are 0°14'27.0"N, 33°59'29.0"E (Latitude:0.240841; Longitude:33.991387).

Overview
Majanji sits on the north-eastern corner of Lake Victoria in Uganda, very close to the international border with Kenya. The principal activity in the town is fishing, although the weekly catch has declined due to overfishing. Iglo Foods Fish Factory, a local fish processor, produces only 10 tonnes of fish every week, compared to 40,000 tonnes daily when they first opened in the early 2000s.

Population
The national census in August 2014 put the population of Majanji sub-county at 11,274.

Points of interest
The following points of interest lie within the town limits or close to the edges of the town:
 The southern end of the Musita–Mayuge–Lumino–Majanji–Busia Road
 offices of Majanji Town Council
 Majanji central market
 Sangalo Sand Beach

 * Victoria Coconut Beach Hotel(accommodation, camping, food and drinks, fishing and boat sailing and many more).

See also
List of cities and towns in Uganda
List of roads in Uganda
 * Victoria coconut Road

References

Busia District, Uganda
Populated places in Eastern Region, Uganda
Cities in the Great Rift Valley